Paul Blake (born 16 April 1983) is a South African field hockey player who competed in the 2008 Summer Olympics. For 100 days, beginning 23 October 2013, he pulled a cart (unassisted) by foot across India from Mumbai to Everest Base Camp a  journey. He is now teaching in Hong Kong in West Island School.

References

External links

1983 births
Living people
South African male field hockey players
Olympic field hockey players of South Africa
Field hockey players at the 2008 Summer Olympics
2010 Men's Hockey World Cup players
21st-century South African people